The Kronstadt Naval Museum is a museum devoted to the history of underwater diving in Russia and the military history of Kronstadt in the 20th century. The museum is located on Kotlin Island in the central part of Kronstadt.

History 

The museum was opened on May 4, 2012 by efforts of enthusiasts and financial support of an engineering company Fertoing Ltd. ahead of the important anniversary – 130 years of the diving service in Russia. The name of Kronstadt is closely connected with establishment of the diving service in Russia as the first state military diving school was founded here on May 5, 1882 by the order of  Alexander III. This order said that the diving school was established to raise diving officers and ratings for marine purposes and underwater blasting. This date is considered to be the official foundation date of the diving service in Russia.

Collection 

The exhibition occupies two rooms: the bigger one is devoted to the diving history, the smaller – to the  Great Patriotic War,  Leningrad Siege, and the Kronstadt military history. The museum houses a wide collection of diving equipment of different times, noteworthy, that all equipment is still operational. The collection comprises several diving helmets including the famous  3-bolt helmet (Russian “УВС-50М”) and 12-bolt coupled helmet. One of the most interesting and attractive exhibits of the 20th century are two surface and submerged diver delivery vessels Proton and Proteus used for sabotage, saboteurs’ weapon, suits of underwater swimmers. Besides, there is ventilated diving equipment, breathing sets of different types and purposes, dive knives, personal divers’ belongings, documents, recovered cannonballs etc. To the display items belong a torpedo firing panel and a diving immersion suit with a self-contained underwater breathing apparatus (Russian “ИДА-59”).

In May 2015, one more valuable exhibit returned from the Staraya Derevnya Restoration and Storage Centre of the State Hermitage Museum – the 12-bolt diving helmet that belonged to the Senior Chief Navy Diver Nikita Sergeyevich Myshlyaevskiy, who died underwater in the Gulf of Finland not far from Shepelevo Lighthouse in 1944 during a combat mission. The wall-mount display panels show all milestones of the diving history in Russia from its very beginning: foundation and life of the Kronstadt Naval Diving School in pictures by Karl Bulla (1913) of Central Diving Station of the Public Transport Committee,  Special diving expedition EPRON (Russian “ЭПРОН”), vessel recovery operations, divers’ pre-war and Great Patriotic War trainings.

There is a special room devoted to heroic defense of Kronstadt and defenders’ life during the Great Patriotic War. Among witnesses of those hard times are naval distinctive insignias, weapons and bullets, service medals, badges, uniform, damaged helmets, documents, front-line letters, domestic items of peaceful life – toys and bells. Visitors will definitely remember a mortar, mounted machinegun, subgun, captured MP40 submachine gun, articles of German field clothing, pots, peak caps, knives, watches and other belongings of the Winter War soldiers.

The Kronstadt siege exhibition, small yet touching and highly emotional, consists of a woman’s diary, bread coupons, currency of the 1940s, posters, certificates and letters.

Building 

The building that houses the Naval Museum was erected at the end of the 19th – beginning of the 20th century and belonged to Aleksandr Mikhailovich Britnev. His father,  Mikhail Osipovich Britnev, established a private diving school here in Kronstadt in 1868-1869.

Public education 

The museum houses a lecture hall for meetings, conferences to promote the Russian history and Kronstadt history in particular, diving service, marine archeology, military history among school children and teenagers. Children can take pictures, try on pieces of uniform, diving equipment and feel as real underwater explorers. The Kronstadt Naval Museum holds open lessons for school children of young and middle age to promote diving history, Kronstadt and history of the Russian Navy in general. The topics for such meetings are usually connected with diving milestone anniversaries. The museum has a rich library with trade publications, art books, books on naval and military history. Some of the diving magazines of the 1920-40s are represented here exclusively and almost impossible to find even in national libraries.

Management 

 Vladimir Shatrov (2012 – present)

External links 

 

Military and war museums in Saint Petersburg
Maritime museums in Russia
Museums established in 2012
2012 establishments in Russia
Kronstadt
Cultural heritage monuments of regional significance in Saint Petersburg